Rustavi is a city in the southeast of Georgia, in the region of Kvemo Kartli and  southeast of capital Tbilisi. It has a population of 130,100 (2021), making it the fourth most populous city in Georgia. Its economy is dominated by the Rustavi Metallurgical Plant.

History
Rustavi is one of the ancient towns of Georgia. The history of Rustavi has two phases: an early history from ancient times until the city was destroyed in the 13th century and modern history from the Soviet era to the present.

Early history
The foundation of Rustavi is dated from time immemorial. 11th-century Georgian chronicler, Leonti Mroveli in his work "Georgian Chronicles" connects foundation of the city to Kartlos, the eponymous ancestor of Georgians, whose wife have founded town along Kura river called Bostan-Kalaki (lit. "city of gardens"). The same chronicler, who also worked on “The life of the Kings”, mentions the town Rustavi among those castles, which opposed Alexander the Great's army, although it is proved that Alexander has never invaded Iberia. Rustavi is mentioned among such ancient towns as Uplistsikhe, Urbnisi, Mtskheta and Sarkineti. It could be assumed that Rustavi as a city had been founded at least in the 5th–4th centuries B.C. Besides the manuscripts, the excavations of the castle Rustavi prove that Rustavi was an important political and administrative center of Iberia. In late 4th century A.D Trdat of Iberia had built a church and a canal in Rustavi.

During the reign of Vakhtang I of Iberia (5th century) Rustavi took an important part in the political life in Kingdom of Iberia. At the beginning of the 6th century, in 503, Sassanids conquered Iberia and turned it into ordinary Persian province ruled by a marzpan (governor). However, Byzantine Emperor Heraclius's offensive in 627 and 628 brought final victory over the Persians and ensured Byzantine predominance in Georgia, until the invasion of the Arabs. In struggle against Arab occupation Rustavi belonged to Principality of Kakheti, the latter would form Kakhetian kingdom, whose ruler Kvirike III the Great would install Eristavi (duke) in Rustavi. On Kvirike's death, Kakheti was temporarily annexed to the Kingdom of Georgia. As soon as Arabs were defeated, in 1068 Georgia was invaded by resurgent Turk-Seljuks from Central Asia, under the command of Sultan Alp Arslan. There was a terrible battle between king Bagrat IV of Georgia and Seljuks, where Bagrat was bitterly defeated and as a result, the king of Kakheti gained independence and got into closer contact with the Turkish-Seljuks to secure independence in this way. After Seljukid invasions of Georgia, allied forces took Tbilisi and Rustavi and gave it to Emir of Tbilisi. During that time Rustavi saw decline, its economy was ruined and due to its strategic location it only remained as a well-fortified town in hands of emirs in Tbilisi. In 1069 Bagrat IV defeated emir Fadlun and captured the fortress of Rustavi, Partskhisi and Agarani. During the anti-Seljuk campaigns led by David IV Rustavi played an essential role in securing Georgia's southern boundaries. Rustavi was finally destroyed after Timur's invasion of Georgia.

Modern history
Rustavi was rebuilt as a major industrial center during the Soviet era. The development of Rustavi was part of Joseph Stalin's accelerated industrialization process, and included ironworks, steelworks, chemical plants and an important railway station on the Tbilisi–Baku railroad line. Rustavi is the site of approximately 90 large and medium-sized industrial plants.

The core of the city's industrial activity was the Rustavi Metallurgical Plant, constructed in 1941–1950 to process iron ore from nearby Azerbaijan. Stalin brought workers from  various regions in Georgia, specifically from the poorer rural provinces of Western Georgia. Rustavi became a key industrial centre for the Transcaucasus region. The industrial activity expanded to include the manufacture of steel products, cement, chemicals, and synthetic fibers.

May 1944 was a significant time in the history of modern Rustavi. Geologists began to define the soil of the place where the metallurgical works were to be built. The area was nearly empty, and there were only temporary lodgings and slums available. many people arrived at Rustavi, coming from different parts of Georgia. The first newspaper came out on 30 August 1944. It was called “Metallurgiisatvis” (meaning "For Metallurgy" in Georgian).

Rustavi celebrated frequent housewarming parties as many people migrated to the city each day. In 1948 the first streets were “baptized” in Rustavi. The first street was named after the Young Communist League, the second, after the builders of Rustavi, and the third, after its ancient name Bostan-Kalaki.

On 19 January 1948, a decree of the Supreme Soviet of Georgian Soviet Socialist Republic declared Rustavi a town of republican importance. On 27 April 1950, the whole town celebrated the production of the first industrial Georgian steel. It was founded on the roots of the famous ancestors Khalibs.

German POWs who were captured in World War II were enlisted to build the city of Rustavi. Modern Rustavi is divided into two parts—Dzveli Rustavi (Old Rustavi) and Akhali Rustavi (New Rustavi). Old Rustavi adheres to Stalinist architectural style while New Rustavi is dominated by a multitude of Soviet-era block apartments. The fall of the Soviet Union in 1991 proved disastrous for Rustavi, as it also caused the collapse of the integrated Soviet economy of which the city was a key part. Most of its industrial plants were shut down and 65% of the city's population became unemployed, with the attendant social problems of high crime and acute poverty that such a situation brings. The population shrank from 160,000 in the mid-1990s to 116,000 in 2002 as residents moved elsewhere in search of work.

New York-based artist Greg Lindquist (b. 1979) has documented Rustavi's crumbling concrete factories in his paintings and installations, such as the exhibition "Nonpasts" in 2010. Lindquist has also worked with Georgian collaborators, such as artist Gio Sumbadze (b. 1976), in projects that address the current social, cultural and political significance of these architectures. In 2010, the Laura Palmer Foundation staged an exhibition at the Ministry of Transportation building (Tbilisi Roads Ministry Building) in which Lindquist and Sumbadze installed paintings addressing the history of Georgia's transportation system. This BOMB magazine interview with La Toya Frazier for the exhibition "Planet of Slums" addresses many of the complexities of Lindquist's work in the Republic of Georgia.

Demographics 

At the beginning of 2021, Rustavi had more than 130,072 inhabitants, an increase of 4% since the 2014 census. This increase makes Rustavi the fourth most populous city in Georgia, just behind Kutaisi, which is suffering from ongoing contraction. Rustavi experienced rapid growth due to industrialization under Stalin. Since the regained Georgian independence in 1991 and the years of civil war and crisis that followed, many residents (e)migrated due to unemployment. The low point was reached around 2002, and growth clearly picked up in the 2010s while industrial activities and employment have resumed. 

In 2014, the ethnic composition of Rustavi was almost 92% Georgian, with minority communities of Azerbaijanis (3.7%), Armenians (1.6%) and Russians (1.2%). Remarkably enough, more than 500 Ossetians (0.4%) lived in the city. Other ethnic minorities included 315 Ukrainians, 239 Yazidis, over 166 Greeks, 55 Assyrians and smaller numbers of Kists, Jews, Abkhazian and Bosha.

The proportions of the ethnic minorities in the city has not always been this way. Especially in the Soviet period these were completely different, with striking numbers of Russians. The city also had a substantial Ossetian community. Migration during and after the fall of the Soviet Union and due to civil conflicts has made the city much more mono-ethnic Georgian.

City governance 

Rustavi is a self-governing city. The representative body of the city is the City Council, and the executive body is the City Hall. Administratively, Rustavi is divided into 10 territorial bodies:

David Agmashenebeli district
Old Rustavi district
Shota Rustaveli district
Zhiuli Shartava district
Giorgi Chkondideli district
Ilia Chavchavadze district
Vakhtang Gorgasali district
Iakob Tsurtaveli district
Nikoloz Baratashvili district
district named after the 13 Assyrian fathers

City council

Rustavi City Assembly (Georgian: რუსთავის საკრებულო, Rustavi Sakrebulo) is the representative body in Rustavi City that consists of 35 members as of 2021, who are elected every four years.

The last election for the sakrebulo was held in October 2021. Rustavi was one of only seven municipalities where the ruling Georgian Dream party failed to secure a council majority in 2021.

Mayor

The most recent mayoral election was held on 2 October 2021, with a runoff on 30 October which Nino Latsabidze (Georgian Dream) won from Davit Kirkitadze (United National Movement).

The results were as follows:

Previously elected mayors of Rustavi
 Irakli Tabagua (GD) (2017–2021)
 Davit Jikia (GD) (2014–2017)

Climate
Rustavi has a humid subtropical climate (Köppen climate classification: Cfa) with hot summers and relatively cold winters.

Sports

Rustavi Race Circuit
The last of the racetracks built in the USSR. Competitions started in the end of 1979 and the track hosted eleven USSR Championship events until 1989. Prior to 2009 the condition of the track had deteriorated. That same year the area was sold to the private company Stromos on the State auction. After total reconstruction in 2011–2012, the track reopened and has hosted a number of racing events, such as the TCR International Series, Formula Alfa series, Legends championship, BMW Annual Festival, drag and drift competitions, amateur races and many more.

The city is home to the basketball club BC Rustavi of the Georgian Superliga. It plays its home games in the Rustavi sports arena.

Notable people
 

Robert Tedeyev (born 1986), former Russian professional football player

Twin towns – sister cities

Rustavi is twinned with:

 Akmenė, Lithuania
 Cherkasy, Ukraine
 İnegöl, Turkey
 Ivano-Frankivsk, Ukraine
 Kiruna, Sweden
 Kryvyi Rih, Ukraine
 Łódź, Poland
 Panevėžys, Lithuania
 Płock, Poland
 Sumqayit, Azerbaijan
 Zhodzina, Belarus

See also

 List of monuments in Rustavi
 Rustavi City Assembly
 Internati
 Rustavi 2, television broadcasting company
 Rustavi Steel
 Rustavi International Motorpark

References

 
Cities and towns in Kvemo Kartli
Self-governing cities in Georgia (country)
Municipalities of Kvemo Kartli